Martín Ramos  (born 26 August 1991) is an Argentine professional volleyball player, a member of the Argentine national team. A bronze medallist at the Olympic Games Tokyo 2020. At the professional club level, he plays for Guaguas Las Palmas.

Honours

Clubs
 CSV South American Club Championship
  Linares 2012 – with UPCN Vóley Club
  Belo Horizonte 2013 – with UPCN Vóley Club
  Belo Horizonte 2014 – with UPCN Vóley Club
  San Juan 2015 – with UPCN Vóley Club
  Belo Horizonte 2019 – with UPCN Vóley Club
  Contagem 2020 – with UPCN Vóley Club

 CEV Challenge Cup
  2021/2022 – with Narbonne Volley

 National championships
 2011/2012  Argentine Championship, with UPCN Vóley Club
 2012/2013  Argentine Cup, with UPCN Vóley Club
 2012/2013  Argentine Championship, with UPCN Vóley Club
 2013/2014  Argentine Cup, with UPCN Vóley Club
 2013/2014  Argentine Championship, with UPCN Vóley Club
 2014/2015  Argentine Championship, with UPCN Vóley Club
 2015/2016  Argentine Cup, with UPCN Vóley Club
 2015/2016  Argentine Championship, with UPCN Vóley Club
 2017/2018  Argentine Championship, with UPCN Vóley Club
 2019/2020  Argentine Cup, with UPCN Vóley Club

Youth national team
 2011  FIVB U21 World Championship

Individual awards
 2014: CSV South American Club Championship – Best Middle Blocker 
 2015: CSV South American Club Championship – Best Middle Blocker 
 2017: Pan American Cup – Most Valuable Player
 2021: CSV South American Championship – Best Middle Blocker

References

External links

 
 
 
 Player profile at Volleybox.net 

1991 births
Living people
Volleyball players from Buenos Aires
Argentine men's volleyball players
Volleyball players at the 2015 Pan American Games
Medalists at the 2015 Pan American Games
Pan American Games medalists in volleyball
Pan American Games gold medalists for Argentina
Olympic volleyball players of Argentina
Olympic medalists in volleyball
Olympic bronze medalists for Argentina
Volleyball players at the 2016 Summer Olympics
Volleyball players at the 2020 Summer Olympics
Medalists at the 2020 Summer Olympics
Argentine expatriate sportspeople in France
Expatriate volleyball players in France
Argentine expatriate sportspeople in Spain
Expatriate volleyball players in Spain
Middle blockers